"Weekend of Mystery" is the fourth and final single from Bernard Fanning's 2005 debut album Tea and Sympathy.  The single was released as an iTunes Store exclusive single on 15 August 2006.  It was not available on the regular CD versions of Tea and Sympathy, only on the iTunes edition.  "Weekend of Mystery" was first performed live by Fanning in 2002 in Melbourne, in a concert designed to raise awareness of issues relating to Woomera Detention Centre.

Track listing
"Weekend of Mystery" – 3:26

References

2006 singles
Bernard Fanning songs
Song recordings produced by Tchad Blake
2005 songs
Dew Process singles
Songs written by Bernard Fanning